Leucoma clara is a moth in the  family Erebidae. It is found in Taiwan and India.

The wingspan is 35–36 mm.

References

Moths described in 1865
Lymantriinae